Reiss is a village in the former county of Caithness, now in the Highland council area of northern Scotland. It is well known in the Caithness area for its beach and also the 18-hole Wick golf course.

Reiss is mainly made up of two areas, the Reiss Village and Nordwall Park housing areas. Added to this there are various houses dotted through the area, as well as a trailer park.

Populated places in Caithness